The 1931 Southern Conference football season was the college football games played by the member schools of the Southern Conference as part of the 1931 college football season. The season began on September 19.

In the annual Rose Bowl game, the SoCon champion Tulane Green Wave lost to the PCC champion USC Trojans 21–12. The Georgia Bulldogs suffered their only two losses to Tulane and USC.

It was Wallace Wade's first year as Duke head coach.

Regular season

SoCon teams in bold.

Week One

Week Two

Week Three

Week Four

Week Five

Week Six

Week Seven

Week Eight

Week Nine

Week Ten

Week Eleven

Week Twelve

Week Thirteen

Week Fifteen

Bowl games

Awards and honors

All-Americans

E – Jerry Dalrymple, Tulane (AP–1; UP–1; COL–1; CP–1; NEA–1; INS–1; WCFF; LIB; HSM; CH-1; LP; AAB)
E – Vernon "Catfish" Smith, Georgia (AP-1; COL–1; NEA–2; INS–2; HSM; CP–1; CH-2; LP)
T – Ray Saunders, Tennessee (CP-3)
G – Herman Hickman, Tennessee (AP–3; COL–1; NEA–3; INS-3; CP–1; CH-1)
G – Milton Leathers, Georgia (INS-2)
C – Pete Gracey, Vanderbilt (CP-2)
QB – Austin Downes, Georgia (CP-3)
HB – Don Zimmerman, Tulane (AP–2; NEA–2; INS-1; CP–1; CH-2)
HB – Gene McEver, Tennessee (AP–2; NEA–2; INS-2; CP–2)
FB – Johnny Cain, Alabama (UP–1; NEA–3 [picked as halfback]; INS-3; WCFF; CH-2; AAB)
FB – Nollie Felts, Tulane (CP-3)

All-Southern team

The following is the composite All-Southern team of coaches and sports writers compiled by the Associated Press.

References